Harald Nugiseks (22 October 1921 – 2 January 2014) was an Waffen-Oberscharführer (Sergeant) in World War II, who served in the 20th Waffen Grenadier Division of the SS (1st Estonian) of the Waffen-SS. Nugiseks is also one of the four Estonian soldiers who received the Knight's Cross of the Iron Cross.

Biography
Nugiseks was born on Vanaõu farmstead, Karjaküla village, Järva County, Särevere Province, Estonia. His parents were peasant farmers, and Harald attended the basic school at Laupa.

He joined the Estonian Security battalion from the Commercial Institute at Pairu on 2 October 1941. When the German Army invaded Soviet territory it became Heinrich Himmler's policy that all Germanic regiments should be incorporated into Waffen SS units.  Nugiseks became part of 185th battalion of General Georg von Kuchler's 18th Army officially known as Estniche Sicherungs Abteilung which was used as a security unit in the rearguard.

But in 1943 the High Command decided reinforcements were needed for the Leningrad offensive.  In 1943, he voluntarily joined the Estonian Legion. Three Estonian volunteer battalions were sent to Volkhov, when Nugiseks joined 660th commanded by Major Ellram.  The 1st Estonian SS Volunteers was formed at Debica, Poland in August 1942 from police battalions such as Nugiseks.  By March 1943 the unit was fighting with the 5th SS Panzer Division Wiking on the Mius Front in the Ukraine.  Two months later it was expanded into a No.3 Brigade consisting of two regiments, of three battalions each.  They fought in hard battles against Communist Partisans and Soviet Regulars on the Nevel Front, and then at Velikye Luki.  By November 1943, Nugiseks had already come under enemy fire, but the following month was transferred to the newly-formed 16th Army.  In February 1944 his brigade joined Felix Steiner's III (Germanic) SS Panzer Corps, renowned for hard fighting and tactical victories.  In the teeth of repeated counter-attacks by the SS Estonian Division the Soviet infantry were relentless, breaking through the lines.  After a month of brutal and incessant fighting at Siivertsi, thrown back into the river several times, the Soviets eventually reached Nugiseks position to the north of the village Narwa.  The Dutch Nederland brigade's engineers were brought up to plug the gap in the line, but the Soviets called on massive reinforcements.  The Estonians were short of men and facing insuperable odds.

The Estonian volunteers under Nazi control were fighting along the right bank of the Narva River against superior Soviet forces.  Despite being outnumbered the Estonian SS attacked with great ferocity driving back the Russians on the front.  Nugiseks received the Knight's Cross of the Iron Cross for leading the capture of the Vaasa-Siivertsi-Vepsküla bridgehead.  As the I Battalion, Waffen-Grenadier Regiment der SS 46 lost almost all of its officers, Nugiseks stepped in as the leader of the attack. He immediately changed tactics, loading a supply of hand grenade onto sledges so the stormtroopers would not have to crawl back for supplies over the minefields. With hand grenades being passed on along the line of trenches, a bridgehead was at last squeezed in from the north by "rolling" tactics, his platoon engaged in desperate hand-to-hand fighting using spades, hand grenades and bayonets.  Nugiseks was mentioned in the Wehrmachtbericht and in the Nazi Signal magazine following his Knight's Cross award, which was personally given to him by the SA occupation head in Estonia, Karl-Siegmund Litzmann on 9 April 1944, while Nugiseks was recuperating in Türi hospital.  Only the second Estonian to receive the honour, the whole ceremony was filmed for propaganda purposes.  In the action the divisional commander Standartenfuhrer Franz Augsberger, an Austrian, was wounded and also received the Knights Cross.  Unterscharfuhrer Nugiseks was only 22 years old leading a Zugfuhrer (platoon leader) of Estonians defending the homeland against invasion for his unit I.46. and the first non-officer to be so awarded.

Afterwards Nugiseks was demoted for fighting with some soldiers who were harassing Red Cross nurses. During the Soviet assault on Estonia in September 1944, Nugiseks' home was destroyed. Nugiseks was captured by Czech partisans in May 1945 and put in a prisoner-of-war camp. After three unsuccessful escape attempts, he served time after being handed over to the Soviets, who had sentenced him to ten years in the Gulag and five years deportation in Siberia. Nugiseks managed to return to Estonia in 1958: on release from Tyumenskaya oblast he worked as a labourer in Parnu area of Estonia until his retirement.

In the 1970s, he constructed a house for the family using his own hands.  Finally on 21 February 1994, service to his country was recognised when Major-General Aleksander Einseln made Nugiseks a Retired Captain (erukapten) of the Estonian Defence Forces.  Nugiseks attended reburial of Alfons Rebane, another Estonian Knight's Cross of the Iron Cross holder, ordered by the Estonian government.  After 4229 signatures were collected in October 2008, Captain Nugiseks was awarded the Medal of Gratitude by the people of Estonia for his part in the fight against Bolshevism.  Revered and honoured by his community, a bust was posthumously installed at his school.

See also
 Battle for Narva Bridgehead
 Battle of Narva (1944)
 20th Waffen Grenadier Division of the SS (1st Estonian)
 23rd SS Volunteer Panzer Grenadier Division Nederland

References

Citations

Bibliography

 

1921 births
2014 deaths
Estonian military personnel
Estonian people of World War II
People from Türi Parish
Recipients of the Knight's Cross of the Iron Cross
Gulag detainees
Estonian Waffen-SS personnel